Captain Anuj Nayyar, MVC (August 28, 1975 – July 7, 1999) was an Indian Army officer of 17 Jat who was posthumously awarded the Maha Vir Chakra, India's second highest gallantry award, for exemplary valour in combat during operations in the Kargil War in 1999.

Early years and career
Anuj Nayyar was born and grew up in Delhi, India. His father, Satish Kumar Nayyar, worked as a visiting professor in Delhi School of Economics while his mother, Meena Nayyar, worked for the South Campus library of Delhi University. He was a bright student who consistently performed well in academics and sports.

Nayyar received his high-school education from Army Public School, Dhaula Kuan (1993 batch).  He graduated from the National Defence Academy and later was commissioned into the 17th battalion, Jat Regiment (17 Jat) in June 1997 from the Indian Military Academy.

Kargil War

Background
In 1999, the Indian Army detected a massive infiltration by Pakistani military and paramilitary forces in the Kargil region of Jammu Kashmir. The army quickly mobilized its forces to drive out the Pakistani infiltrators from Indian territory. 17 Jat was one of the battalions deployed in the region. Nayyar's first major operation involved securing Pimple II, a peak within the Pimple Complex, on the western slopes of Point 4875, a strategic peak in the Mushkoh Valley.

Due to its strategic location, securing Point 4875 was a top priority for the Indian Army. The peak, which stood at 15,990 feet above sea level, had extremely steep slopes and capturing the peak without aerial support was considered near impossible. In a last-ditch attempt, C Coy, 17 Jat, of which Nayyar was the second-in-command, decided to secure the peak without waiting for any aerial support on 6 July.

Operation
During the initial phase of C Coy's assault on Pimple II, Nayyar's company commander was injured, and command devolved upon him. As the unit advanced under heavy enemy artillery and mortar fire, the lead section reported the location of 3-4 enemy bunkers. Nayyar moved forward and destroyed the first bunker with a rocket launcher and grenades. Still under heavy fire, he then proceeded with the lead section, which consisted of 7 personnel, and destroyed two more bunkers. During the battle, Nayyar killed 9 Pakistani soldiers and destroyed three medium machine gun bunkers. The company then began its assault on the last remaining bunker, but while clearing it, an enemy RPG directly hit Nayyar and martyred him instantly. Pimple II was captured on 8 July, but Anuj Nayyar had to pay his supreme sacrifice on the mission.

During the entire battle for Pimple Complex, 46 regular members of the Pakistan Army, an unknown number of Pakistani paramilitary troopers, militants were killed and 11 Indian Army troops, including Capt. Nayyar, were martyred. The securing of Pimple Complex paved the way for the recapture of Tiger Hill which finally forced Pakistan to retreat back across the Line of Control.

Recognition and legacy 
Nayyar was posthumously awarded the Maha Vir Chakra for his bravery and leadership in combat.

Nayyar's father, S.K. Nayyar, was allotted a gas station in Delhi by the Government of India in recognition of the services of his son. Tejbir Singh, a fellow soldier of the Jat Regiment, named his son Anuj in honour of Nayyar.

A road in Janakpuri area of Delhi, was named as "Captain Anuj Nayyar Marg."

Maha Vir Chakra citation

In Media 
Following Nayyar's death, his heroics during the war were widely covered by Delhi's print media with editorials like Times of India and Hindustan Times running full-page descriptions of his Kargil mission. The plight and ill-treatment of his parents by Indian government officials after his death became the subject of several short telefilms and was widely reported in the Indian news media. Several books and Indian films were made to depict Anuj's life and glorify his contribution to the Indian Army.
 In 2003 the Hindi film LOC Kargil, directed by J.P. Dutta, which depicted the endeavours of the Indian Army during the Kargil War, was released in which Saif Ali Khan played the role of Anuj Nayyar.
 In 2003, the Hindi film Dhoop directed by national award winner Ashwini Chaudhary, was released which depicted the life of Anuj's parents after his death. Om Puri played the role of Prof. Kapoor that was based on Prof S.K. Nayyar, Anuj's father. Revathi played the role of Mrs. Kapoor, Capt Rohit Kapoor's mother.

References

External links 
Bharat Rakshak biography on Anuj
List of Kargil heroes
S.K. Nayyar's viewpoint on Kargil
An article on Anuj by Lokesh Sopre

1999 deaths
Indian military personnel killed in action
People of the Kargil War
Recipients of the Maha Vir Chakra
1975 births